"Lonely Call" is a song by American singer and songwriter RaeLynn. It was released on June 26, 2017, as the second single from her debut studio album, WildHorse (2017). The song was written by RaeLynn, Nicolle Galyon, and Rob Hawkins.

Background
In an interview with Sounds Like Nashville, RaeLynn explained the song: 

She also said in an interview with Rolling Stone Country:

Critical reception
Taste of Countrys Sterling Whitaker said "musically the track is an amalgam of sweet pop-country melodicism and some surprisingly traditional instruments, with a reverb-drenched banjo and simple acoustic guitars framing the gentle, moody verse before stacked guitars lift the song up into a sweeping chorus. RaeLynn's uniquely smoky vocal tone is perfectly suited to the aching, regretful subject matter that she's delivering, and the result is a track that is so universally identifiable that it could very well carry her career to new heights at country radio." Liv Stecker of The Boot stated "an echoing reflection, the song tells the story of a girl who has gone from a place of importance in a relationship to an afterthought. In her relatable style, RaeLynn captures the struggle that comes with not settling for less than you should, and the will power that it sometimes takes to make that choice." Pastes Robert Ham labeled it a "defiant kiss off to a mercurial lover."

Charts

Certifications

Release history

References

2017 singles
2017 songs
Songs written by Nicolle Galyon